Hajar Ali (born 1978 or 1979) is a Singaporean entrepreneur, founder of Urbane Nomads and the website Travel Like a Humanitarian. She was the first recorded woman to cross the Rub' al Khali, the "Empty Quarter" of the Arabian Peninsula.

Ali has a master's degree in strategic studies from the Institute of Defense and Strategic Studies in Singapore, now the S. Rajaratnam School of International Studies; her thesis "[applied] James C Scott’s model of peasant resistance to the daily transgressions of Iranian youths against the ruling mullahs". She previously worked as a real estate agent.

Ali founded Urbane Nomads, a bespoke luxury travel agency, in 2008 after conceiving the idea while traveling in Patagonia. A lover of horses, she likes to include riding in the company's trips. She later launched Travel Like a Humanitarian, a website on which NGOs can advertise travel offerings.

In March 2012, she made the first known crossing of the Rub' al Khali by a woman. She intends to make a future expedition to the pole of inaccessibility in Antarctica.

In 2011 Ali was included by Singapore Women's Weekly in its annual "Great Women of Our Time".

She serves as the editor of Mensa Singapore's newsletter and is a Fellow of the Royal Geographical Society. She considers Singapore her home, but  lives in Istanbul. She has a Bengal cat named Loki. Ali is a practicing Muslim but does not wear the hijab.

References

External links
 Personal website

Living people
Singaporean businesspeople
Female travelers
Singaporean women in business
Fellows of the Royal Geographical Society
Year of birth missing (living people)